Leg warmers are coverings for the lower legs, similar to long socks but thicker and generally footless. Leg warmers are worn to keep the lower legs warm in colder weather. They can be tubular sleeves, long fabric wrappings, or simple pieces of fur or fabric tied around the calves. They are used in several outdoor activities and sports including cycling, soccer, hockey, hiking, ice skating, and dance.

They are used as dancewear by ballet and other classic dancers in order to keep the leg muscles warm and to prevent cramping or other muscle injuries. No scientific data has been yet collected to substantiate the claim that leg warmers prevent injury.

Traditionally knitted from pure sheep wool, modern variants are more typically made of cotton, synthetic fibers, or both. Some are made of other materials, such as chenille.

Leg warmers can vary in length, and in width, due to the material's stretchiness. They are commonly worn between the ankle to just below the knee, though many dancers prefer it to extend to cover the lower parts of the thigh. Some cover the entire foot—these "warmers" usually have a pad that grips the floor so the dancer does not slip. Some leg warmers are particularly short and made of thinner material; these are also known as "ankle warmers".

Originally, legwarmers were worn by dancers to keep their muscles from cramping after stretching. In the early 1980s leg warmers became a fad after David Lee and Trisha Kate opened a dancewear shop in the East Village, New York. They mainly sold legwarmers. Wearing them was fashionable among teenage girls; later to be an adopted fashion by boys in the city of Berkeley in the San Francisco Bay Area.  Their popularity was partly due to the influence of the films Fame, Xanadu and Flashdance and the concurrent aerobics craze. They were worn with leggings, jeans, and tights or as part of aerobic wear. They were internationally popular in the 1980s.

Recently, leg warmers have become popular with new parents as a way to keep babies and toddlers warm while making it easy to change diapers. They also have become popular again in the 2010s with girls, tweens, teens, college students and women. They are worn just like knee socks are with boots. Either over leggings, tights or jeans and then a pair of riding boots is worn and the leg warmers are slouched at the top of the riding boot.

See also
 Arm warmer
 Spats (footwear)
 Gaiters
 Leggings
 Puttee
 Loose socks

References 

 Leg warmers of the 80s

History of fashion
1980s fashion
2000s fashion
2010s fashion
Sportswear
Dancewear
Hosiery
1980s fads and trends

de:Gamasche